Keith English may refer to:

 Keith English (end) (1927–1989), Canadian football player
 Keith English (punter) (1966–2010), American football player
 Keith English (politician) (1967–2018), American politician